Bigelowiella is a genus of chlorarachniophyte algae, containing a secondary plastid within a reduced cytoplasmic compartment that contains a vestigial nucleomorph.

Genomes
The Bigelowiella natans nuclear genome was the first to be sequenced from a rhizarian protist, containing 94.7 Mbp encoding 21,708 genes.

References

Cercozoa genera
Filosa